Walter Parazaider (born March 14, 1945) is an American woodwind musician best known for being a founding member of the rock band Chicago. He plays a wide variety of wind instruments, including saxophone, flute, and clarinet.  He also occasionally plays guitar.

Early life
Parazaider was born in Maywood, Illinois, and began playing the clarinet at the age of 9. As a teenager, his growing talent was being groomed for a career as a professional orchestral musician, and he gained a Bachelor of Arts degree in classical clarinet performance from DePaul University.

Career with Chicago
Inspired by the Beatles hit "Got to Get You Into My Life", Parazaider became enamored of the idea of creating a rock 'n' roll band with horns. Early practice sessions at Parazaider's house included guitarist Terry Kath and drummer Danny Seraphine, who were both friends during his teenage years. Another friend who became involved was future Chicago producer James William Guercio.

The band, originally called The Big Thing, eventually became Chicago with the addition of Lee Loughnane on trumpet, James Pankow on trombone, Robert Lamm on keyboards, and Peter Cetera on bass. Parazaider's primary musical role in the band has consisted of playing woodwinds on James Pankow's horn arrangements. Never a prolific writer, Parazaider's compositional contributions ("It Better End Soon: 2nd Movement", "Free Country", "Aire", "Devil's Sweet", "Window Dreamin'") have been few relative to the other members.

Parazaider performs the highly recognizable flute solo in the Chicago hit "Colour My World", which became a popular 'slow dance' song at high school proms during the 1970s. The band's 1973 hit "Just You 'n' Me" also features a Parazaider solo, on soprano sax.

In 2008, he was awarded an honorary Doctor of Humane Letters by DePaul University.

He is also a member of Phi Mu Alpha Sinfonia and was given the National Citation, being recognized as Signature Sinfonian along with fellow Chicago members and Sinfonians on August 26, 2009.

A member of Chicago from its inception, Parazaider continued to tour extensively with the band until his retirement from touring in 2017 due to a heart condition. He is now included on the band's "Tribute to Founding Members" page alongside Kath, Seraphine, and Cetera.

Personal life
Parazaider has been married to his wife JacLynn for almost five decades and has two daughters, Laura and Felicia. He is of Croatian descent. In April 2021, Parazaider announced that he has been diagnosed with Alzheimer's disease.

References

External links
Chicago's official website

1945 births
Living people
American jazz saxophonists
American male saxophonists
American rock saxophonists
American flautists
American jazz flautists
American jazz clarinetists
American multi-instrumentalists
Chicago (band) members
Musicians from Chicago
DePaul University alumni
American people of Croatian descent
People from Maywood, Illinois
20th-century American saxophonists
21st-century American saxophonists
Jazz musicians from Illinois
20th-century clarinetists
21st-century clarinetists
20th-century American male musicians
21st-century American male musicians
American male jazz musicians
20th-century flautists
21st-century flautists